Haliotis geigeri is a species of sea snail, a marine gastropod mollusc in the family Haliotidae, the abalones.

Description
The size of the oblong, somewhat convex shell varies between 29 mm and 41 mm. The coloration is bright red to reddish brown.

Distribution
This species occurs off and is endemic to São Tomé and Príncipe Islands, Gulf of Guinea, West Africa.

References

 Owen, B. (2014). A new species of Haliotis (Gastropoda) from São Tomé and Príncipe Islands, Gulf of Guinea, with comparisons to other Haliotis found in the Eastern Atlantic and Mediterranean. Zootaxa. 3838(1): 113–119

External links
 

geigeri
Endemic fauna of São Tomé and Príncipe
Invertebrates of São Tomé and Príncipe
Gastropods described in 2014